Events from the year 1894 in Scotland.

Incumbents 

 Secretary for Scotland and Keeper of the Great Seal – Sir George Trevelyan, Bt

Law officers 
 Lord Advocate – John Blair Balfour
 Solicitor General for Scotland – Alexander Asher; then Thomas Shaw

Judiciary 
 Lord President of the Court of Session and Lord Justice General – Lord Robertson
 Lord Justice Clerk – Lord Kingsburgh

Events 
 5 July – racing cutter Valkyrie II (1893) collides with Satanita on the Firth of Clyde and sinks, with one fatality.
 11 July – rebuilt St Cuthbert's Church, Edinburgh, dedicated.
 July – Marion Gilchrist becomes the first woman to graduate from the University of Glasgow and the first woman to qualify in medicine from a Scottish university.
 7 August – the West Highland Railway, operated by the North British Railway, is publicly opened to Fort William.
 25 August – Local Government (Scotland) Act 1894 receives the Royal Assent. Parochial boards replaced by elected parish councils.
 December – Longmorn distillery begins production.
 Lady Victoria Colliery comes into production at Newtongrange, Midlothian.
 McVitie's biscuit factory in Edinburgh is burned down but rebuilt.
 Elsie Inglis sets up a medical practice in Edinburgh.
 Craigholme School founded by Mrs Jessie Murdoch as Pollokshields Ladies' School.
 Alyth golf course laid out by Old Tom Morris.
 Marion Adams-Acton publishes Adventures of a perambulator: true details of a family history.

Births 
 26 March – Alexander Thom, aerodynamicist and archaeoastronomer (died 1985)
 13 May – Joe Corrie, miner, poet and playwright (died 1968)
 28 June – Allardyce Nicoll, literary scholar (died 1976 in England)
 29 June – David Steele, international footballer and manager (died 1964)
 14 October – Victoria Drummond, marine engineer (died 1978 in England)
 Jimmy MacBeath, folk singer (died 1972)
 R. M. Smyllie, journalist (died 1954 in Ireland)

Deaths 
 3 September – John Veitch, poet, philosopher and historian (born 1829)
 3 December – Robert Louis Stevenson, novelist, poet, essayist and travel writer (born 1850; dies on Samoa)

The arts
 Ian Maclaren's stories Beside the Bonnie Brier Bush are published.
 Robert Fuller Murray (born 1863 in the United States) dies; Robert F. Murray: His Poems with a Memoir is published posthumously edited by Andrew Lang.

See also 
 Timeline of Scottish history
 1894 in the United Kingdom

References 

 
Years of the 19th century in Scotland
Scotland
1890s in Scotland